Muzaffer Demirhan (17 July 1932 – 11 December 2002) was a Turkish alpine skier. He competed at the 1948, 1956, 1960 and the 1964 Winter Olympics.

References

1932 births
2002 deaths
Turkish male alpine skiers
Olympic alpine skiers of Turkey
Alpine skiers at the 1948 Winter Olympics
Alpine skiers at the 1956 Winter Olympics
Alpine skiers at the 1960 Winter Olympics
Alpine skiers at the 1964 Winter Olympics
Sportspeople from Gümüşhane
20th-century Turkish people